The Sleeping Muse ( or ) is a bronze sculpture created by Constantin Brâncuși in 1910. It was originally carved from marble using Baroness Renée-Irana Frachon as the model. Refining the sculpture, Brâncuși cast several of the sculptures in bronze, which are now in museums around the world, including the Metropolitan Museum of Art in New York City, the Musée National d'Art Moderne in Paris, and the Art Institute of Chicago. It is a model of a head, without a body, with markings to show features such as hair, nose, lips, and closed eyes. In A History of Western Art, Laurie Adams says that the sculpture has "an abstract, curvilinear quality and a smooth contour that create an impression of elegance." By casting them in metal with a fine finish, these sculptures are "self-sufficient, archetypal modern forms".

References

1910 sculptures
Marble sculptures
Bronze sculptures in New York City
Sculptures by Constantin Brâncuși
Bronze sculptures in Paris
Bronze sculptures in Illinois
Statues in New York City
Statues in Illinois
Statues in France
Sculptures in the collection of the Musée National d'Art Moderne